John Douglas Dagenhard (April 25, 1917 – July 16, 2001) was a Major League Baseball pitcher. The ,  right-hander appeared in two games for the Boston Braves at the end of the 1943 season.

Dagenhard is one of many ballplayers who only appeared in the major leagues during World War II.  He made his major league debut on September 28, 1943, and pitched scoreless relief in a doubleheader against the St. Louis Cardinals at Sportsman's Park.

On October 3, 1943, he was the starting pitcher in the second game of a doubleheader against the Chicago Cubs at Wrigley Field, the final game of the season. He pitched a complete game and the Braves won, 5–2. Both runs were unearned.

References

External links

Major League Baseball pitchers
Baseball players from Ohio
Boston Braves players
People from Magnolia, Ohio
1917 births
2001 deaths
Ohio State Buckeyes baseball players